The Saturn II was a series of American expendable launch vehicles, studied by North American Aviation under NASA contract in 1966, derived from the Saturn V rocket used for the Apollo lunar program. The intent of the study was to eliminate production of the Saturn IB, and create a lower-cost heavy launch vehicle based on Saturn V hardware.

For this study, the Boeing company also investigated configurations designated INT-20 and INT-21 which employed its S-IC first stage, and eliminated either North American's S-II second stage, or the Douglas S-IVB third stage. Budget constraints led to cancellation of the study and exclusive use of the Space Shuttle for orbital payloads.

Concept
There was a large payload gap between the Saturn IB's  low Earth orbit capacity and the Saturn V's  capability. 
In the mid-1960s NASA's Marshall Space Flight Center (MSFC) initiated several studies to extend the capabilities of the Saturn family.
Martin Marietta (builder of Atlas and Titan rockets), Boeing (builder of S-IC first stages), and North American Aviation (builder of the S-II second stage) were three of the companies that provided responses.

North American believed the best way to fill the gap was to use the Saturn V's second stage, the S-II, as the first stage of an intermediate launch vehicle. The basic concept of the Saturn II was to save money by ceasing production of the Saturn IB rocket, and replacing it with launch vehicles built entirely with current Saturn V components. This would allow closing down Chrysler Space Division production lines for the S-IB first stage, and would allow for more efficient integration of rocket systems.

Design
The baseline for the Saturn II was a Saturn V, without the Boeing-built S-IC first stage. The Saturn V's second stage S-II became the first stage, and the non-restartable S-IVB-200 used on the Saturn IB became the second stage. Such a vehicle could not fly without modification, because the S-II was designed to operate in the near-vacuum of high altitude space. This required that the S-II be either refit with higher thrust engines, augmented with solid rocket boosters, or both.

Before any version could be put into production, work on all Saturn variants was stopped in favor of launching all future payloads from the Space Shuttle.

Saturn INT-17
The Saturn INT-17 was the first version of the Saturn II to be considered. It replaced the first stage's five J-2 engines with seven higher thrust HG-3-SL engines, giving  of sea level thrust.

This configuration was dropped when it was determined that the HG-3-SL could not compete with the J-2 in terms of overall performance, reliability, and cost-effectiveness. This required the addition of booster stages in order to provide more takeoff thrust.

Saturn INT-18
The Saturn INT-18 would have used the standard S-II with J-2 engines, augmented by two or four Titan SRBs. The UA1204 and UA1207 boosters were considered, with the highest total impulse configuration using four UA1207 boosters, capable of placing  of payload into low Earth orbit. Designers considered changing the amount of fuel loaded into the rocket, and whether to ignite the S-II stage on the ground, or whether to launch using the solids, and start the main stage in flight. Two versions omitted the S-IVB stage.

The following configurations were studied:

Saturn INT-19
The Saturn INT-19 would have used smaller solid boosters, derived from the first stage of the Minuteman missile, to supplement the thrust of the S-II. Eleven configurations were studied, using between four and twelve solids, with some being started at lift-off, and some being started in flight, and varying propellant loads in the Saturn stages. The highest total impulse configuration would have used twelve boosters, with eight started at launch and four started after the first group had been jettisoned.

The following configurations were studied:

See also
Apollo Applications Program
Saturn INT-20
Saturn INT-21

Notes

References 

Encyclopaedia Astronautica Saturn II stage
Encyclopaedia Astronautica Saturn INT-17
Encyclopaedia Astronautica Saturn INT-18
Encyclopaedia Astronautica Saturn INT-19
Final Report - Studies of Improved Saturn V Vehicles and Intermediate Payload Vehicles (PDF format), October 7, 1966.

II